Saint-Amour may refer to:

 Saint-Amour-Bellevue, a commune in the Saône-et-Loire département in France
 Saint-Amour wine, one of the ten crus of Beaujolais
 Saint-Amour, Jura, a commune in the Jura département in France
 William of Saint-Amour, a figure in 13th-century scholasticism, chiefly notable for his withering attacks on the friars
 Martin St. Amour, Canadian professional ice hockey player
 Saint-Amour (film), a 2016 French-Belgian film